The Gareth MacFadyen Cup, more commonly known as the GM Cup, is a perpetual local derby-style memorial rugby union match contested on an annual basis since 2001 in Tokyo, Japan, between the two leading foreign rugby teams in Japan: the Tokyo Crusaders
and the Yokohama Country and Athletic Club.

The match is played in memoriam of Gareth MacFadyen (1976-2000), a young New Zealander who was a successful, young stockbroker and a leading player for both rugby teams in Japan during the period 1996-2000.

The Cup matches have seen some tightly-fought battles over the years, but none closer than the Crusaders' thrilling comeback to win the 2007 GM Cup by one point, after having trailed YCAC by 18 points with less than 15 minutes to play.

Gareth MacFadyen 

Gareth MacFadyen's death in 2000 was widely reported through the Japanese, New Zealander and rugby news media for its untimely and unfortunate circumstances.

He died from extensive burns suffered as a result of being set alight while in costume as a prank during a Christmas work party by a colleague.  His colleague was subsequently jailed for two years on the charge of manslaughter in New Zealand in 2001.

Gareth MacFadyen was known for playing for both the Tokyo Crusaders and the Yokohama Country and Athletic Club rugby teams, which are considered traditional rivals in the greater Tokyo region.

The Tokyo Crusaders rugby club retired their number 8 jumper (Gareth's preferred playing number) as a mark of respect in 2001.

History of the Cup 

The Gareth MacFadyen cup was designed in Brisbane, Australia and made in Christchurch, New Zealand in 2001 as a result of sizeable charitable donations made by Tokyo Crusaders and YCAC club members.

The trophy is a sterling silver cup with winged floral handles on a polished hardwood base, measuring some 60 centimetres in height and surmounted by a golden crusader figurine.

The concepts of a trophy and memorial grudge match were proposed by members of the Tokyo Crusaders rugby club.

The trophy match itself is traditionally held at the Yokohama Country and Athletic Club's ground in Yamate and is played under standard international rugby rules.

Both sides contest the memorial trophy with the winner of the match retaining the right to hold and display the trophy.  

Previous years events have seen the MacFadyen family flown out to Japan from New Zealand to present the winning team with the Cup.

In the years since its inception, it has become widely regarded as the most important and prestigious rugby event in the foreign community calendar in Japan.

Previous GM Cup winners and scores

References

External links 
The Tokyo Crusaders Website
The YCAC Website

Rugby union competitions in Japan
Recurring sporting events established in 2001
2001 establishments in Japan